Mateusz Demczyszak (born 18 January 1986) is a Polish middle distance runner.

Competition record

References
 

1986 births
Living people
Polish male middle-distance runners
Polish male steeplechase runners
Place of birth missing (living people)
Śląsk Wrocław athletes
21st-century Polish people